Oodinotrechus kishimotoi is a species of beetle in the family Carabidae, the only species in the genus Oodinotrechus.

References

Trechinae